Ashkutan (also Romanized as Ashkūtān) is a village in Akhtachi-ye Sharqi Rural District, Simmineh District, Bukan County, West Azerbaijan Province, Iran. At the 2006 census, its population was 170, in 37 families.

References 

Populated places in Bukan County